The 2012 Tianjin Teda F.C. season was the club's 9th season in the Chinese Super League, and 44th season in China's top flight. They started the season with Josip Kuže as manager, before replacing him with Alexandre Guimarães halfway through the season. Domestically they finished the season in 8th place, reached the Fourth Round of the FA Cup and were runners-up in the Super Cup. Tianjin Teda also participated in the AFC Champions League, where they were placed in a group with Seongnam, Nagoya Grampus and Central Coast Mariners, they finished bottom of the group with 3 points.

Squad

Reserve squad

On loan

Transfers

Winter

In

 
 

 

 
 
 
 

Out:

Summer

In

Out:

Competitions

Chinese FA Super Cup

Chinese Super League

Results

League table

Chinese FA Cup

AFC Champions League

Squad statistics

Appearances and goals

|-
|colspan="14"|Players who left Tianjin Teda during the season:
|}

Goal scorers

Disciplinary record

References

Tianjin Jinmen Tiger F.C. seasons
Tianjin Teda F.C.